

The Starr Foundation - Grants (partial list)

Grants (money)
Society-related lists